Adrien Rene Moerman (born 7 August 1988) is a French professional basketball player who plays for BC Zenit Saint Petersburg of the VTB United League. He is also a member of the senior French national team.

Early years 
Moerman was born in Fontenay-aux-Roses. He played youth age basketball with the French clubs Levallois Sporting Club Basket, from 2001 to 2003, and Chorale Roanne Basket, from 2003 to 2005.

Professional career 
Moerman began his pro career in 2005, with the senior men's team of Chorale Roanne Basket. He played for Roanne for two seasons. For the 2007–08 season, he signed with JSF Nanterre of the French 2nd Division. From 2008 to 2011, he played with the French club Orléans Loiret Basket. In July 2011, he signed with the French club SLUC Nancy Basket.

In June 2012, he signed a three-year deal with Bilbao Basket of the Spanish Liga ACB. After one season with the club, he left Bilbao. In June 2013, he returned to France, and signed a two-year deal with Limoges CSP. With Limoges, he won the 2013–14 French Pro A season's championship. In the 2014–15 season, Moerman was named the league MVP of the French Pro League.

In July 2015, he signed with the Turkish Super League club Banvit. After one season, he parted ways with Banvit. On 14 July 2016, he signed a 1+1 deal with the Turkish club Darüşşafaka Doğuş. The Turkish team opted out of their deal on 24 June 2017.

On 12 July 2017, he signed with the Spanish club FC Barcelona Lassa, for the 2017–18 season.

On 1 July 2018, Moerman signed a two year (1+1) deal with the Turkish club Anadolu Efes. He averaged 6.4 points, 4.6 rebounds, and 1.1 assists per game during the 2020–21 season. On 18 June 2021, Moerman renewed his contract with the Turkish club. On 29 June 2022, Moerman officially parted ways with the Turkish club after four successful seasons.

Career statistics

EuroLeague 

|-
| style="text-align:left;"| 2009–10
| style="text-align:left;"| Orléans
| 10 || 6 || 19.9 || .328 || .290 || .833 || 2.9 || .5 || .7 || .7 || 6.2 || 5.4
|-
| style="text-align:left;"| 2011–12
| style="text-align:left;"| Nancy
| 10 || 7 || 29.4 || .431 || .375 || .684 || 5.6 || .8 || 1.4 || .5 || 11.9 || 10.9
|-
| style="text-align:left;"| 2014–15
| style="text-align:left;"| Limoges
| 10 || 9 || 27.0 || .417 || .237 || .867 || 6.9 || 1.2 || .8 || .2 || 9.2 || 11.9
|-
| style="text-align:left;"| 2016–17
| style="text-align:left;"| Darüşşafaka
| 33 || 21 || 21.7 || .396 || .333 || .769 || 5.1 || .8 || .9 || .2 || 8.1 || 8.2
|-
| style="text-align:left;"| 2017–18
| style="text-align:left;"| Barcelona
| 30 || 23 || 22.3 || .446 || .324 || .632 || 5.5 || 1.0 || .6 || .2 || 7.6 || 8.3
|-
| style="text-align:left;"| 2018–19
| style="text-align:left;"| Anadolu Efes
| 37 || 36 || 29.1 || .516 || .401 || .872 || 6.1 || 1.5 || 1.1 || .3 || 12.0 || 15.2
|- class="sortbottom"
| style="text-align:left;"| Career
| style="text-align:left;"|
| 130 || 102 || 24.8 || .446 || .343 || .787 || 5.5 || 1.1 || .9 || .3 || 9.3 || 10.5

National team career 
Moerman was a member of the junior national basketball teams of France. With France's junior national teams, he won gold medals at the 2004 FIBA Europe Under-16 Championship, and the 2006 FIBA Europe Under-18 Championship. He also won the bronze medal at the 2007 FIBA Under-19 World Cup.

Moerman has also been a member of the senior French national team. He played with France at the 2016 Manila FIBA World Olympic Qualifying Tournament.

References

External links 
 Adrien Moerman at archive.fiba.com
 Adrien Moerman at euroleague.net
 Adrien Moerman at lnb.fr 
 Adrien Moerman at tblstat.net
 

1988 births
Living people
Anadolu Efes S.K. players
AS Monaco Basket players
Bandırma B.İ.K. players
Bilbao Basket players
Chorale Roanne Basket players
Darüşşafaka Basketbol players
FC Barcelona Bàsquet players
French expatriate basketball people in Spain
French expatriate basketball people in Turkey
French men's basketball players
Liga ACB players
Limoges CSP players
Nanterre 92 players
Orléans Loiret Basket players
People from Fontenay-aux-Roses
Power forwards (basketball)
SLUC Nancy Basket players
Sportspeople from Hauts-de-Seine